von Stedingk was a Swedish noble family of German origin, and may refer to:

 Curt von Stedingk, a Swedish military commander and diplomat
 Maria Fredrica von Stedingk, a Swedish composer, (the daughter of the above)

Swedish noble families